Gracyn Wheeler Kelleher (July 2, 1914 – October 11, 1980) of California was an amateur tennis player in the 1920s through the 1940s.

Wheeler played for the U.S. Wightman Cup team and was ranked as high as No. 4 in the United States during her career.

Wheeler won the singles title at the Pacific Southwest Championships in September 1936 after a win in the final against Alice Marble who had become  U.S. National champion earlier that month. At the Tri-State Tennis Tournament in Cincinnati, Wheeler won the singles title in 1934 and was a singles finalist in 1940. At the Canadian National tournament, she won the singles title in 1933.

She and Helen Bernard reached the finals of the 1940 National Clay Court Doubles Championships, then lost to Alice Marble and Mary Arnold at a final played in Cincinnati. She won the doubles title at the U.S. Women's Indoor Championships in 1940 partnering Norma Taubele Barber.

She won the Oregon state singles and doubles titles in 1932 and the singles title in 1933. She was a quarterfinalist at the 1936 U.S. Nationals and won the U.S. Girls 18s doubles title in 1932.

In 1929 at the Carlton Winter championships in Cannes, France, Wheeler was seeded No. 1, ahead of French player, future International Tennis Hall of Fame inductee Simonne Mathieu. According to the February 9, 1939, edition of the Oakland Tribune, Mathieu protested, telling officials "Am I not the greatest player in all of France? If I am not seeded No. 1, I will quit the tournament." Wheeler quickly gave up the No. 1 seed in deference to Mathieu, and took her place as the No. 2 seed.

Wheeler participated in the Wimbledon Championships in 1938, 1939 and 1955. She reached the third round in singles and the quarterfinals in doubles, both in 1939. With her husband, she took part in the mixed doubles in 1955 and lost in the second round after a bye in the first.

In August 1939, it was reported that she would marry German tennis player Henner Henkel in October that year. On August 15, 1940 she married Robert J. Kelleher, an American district court judge in Los Angeles, former U.S. Davis Cup captain, president of the United States Tennis Association, and member of the International Tennis Hall of Fame.

She has been inducted into the Southern California Tennis Association Senior Hall of Fame.

References

1914 births
1980 deaths
American female tennis players
Tennis people from California
20th-century American women
20th-century American people